ImmersiVision Interactive Technologies Inc. is a Whistler, British Columbia, Canada based company, founded in early 2004, whose primarily revenue source was the production of immersive virtual reality.  The product is similar to Google Streetview. The Immersive media is a mixture of both indoor and outdoor content. In early 2008 it licensed its technology to VTour Interactive and shortly after ceased active production. VTour is currently active in the production of immersive virtual reality under that licensee agreement and has since expanded upon the technology originally developed by ImmersiVision.

ImmersiVision's virtual destinations:

VTour destinations - under ImmersiVision production license:

Development
The ImmersiVision technology was launched in June 2004 with an online demonstration of an immersive walking tour of Whistler Village. This initial public launch was the first of several StreetView type technologies. A couple years later other similar technologies started appearing such as MotionVR and SuperTour (which later became Everyscape). Google Streetview made its debut in 2007 bringing the concept into the realm of popular culture. 

The ImmersiVision player was a series of nested interactive QuickTime files placed within a single QuickTime skin. Active development of the technology carried on from early 2003 until December 11, 2007 when Apple launched QuickTime 7.3.1 which removed Flash and the advanced interactive features from within QuickTime. Shortly after that the underlying media player was converted over to a component structure consisting of both Adobe Flash and JavaScript.

By the end of 2008 technological development of the immersive virtual reality player was handed over to First Tracks Publishing and the player was renamed VTour. The technology continues to evolve under a licensee agreement and the patronage of 'VTour Interactive'.

Award
 Top 10 New Business Ventures of 2007 in British Columbia. Awarded by New Ventures BC, a not for profit group.
 Most Innovative VR Player of 2007. Awarded by IVRPA (International Virtual Reality Photographers Association)

See also
 Everyscape
 earthmine
 Google Streetview
 MapJack

References

External links
ImmersiVision Sample Destination YouTube Video

Street view services
Companies based in British Columbia